Golets may refer to:

Golets (geography), a type of mountain summit
Golets, Bulgaria, a village in Bulgaria
Arctic char